Le Vieil-Évreux is a commune in the Eure department and Normandy region of France.

It is the site of the Gallo-Roman religious sanctuary Gisacum.

Population

See also
Communes of the Eure department

References

Communes of Eure
Eburovices